Water polo was contested for men only at the 1958 Asian Games in Tokyo, Japan from May 28 to May 31, 1958 at the Metropolitan Indoor Swimming Pool.

The host nation Japan won the gold medal in a round robin competition, Singapore finished second and won the bronze medal while Indonesia finished on third place.

Schedule

Medalists

Results
All times are Japan Standard Time (UTC+09:00)

Final standing

References
 Asian Games water polo medalists

External links
 Results

 
1958 Asian Games events
1958
Asian Games
1958 Asian Games